The Mercedes-Benz GLC is a compact luxury crossover SUV introduced in 2015 for the 2016 model year that replaces the GLK-Class. According to Mercedes-Benz, it is the SUV equivalent to the C-Class. Although officially considered compact, it is considered mid-size in the US market.

Under the vehicle naming scheme maintained by Mercedes-Benz, SUVs use the base name "GL", followed by the model's placement in Mercedes-Benz hierarchy. The "G" is for Geländewagen (German for off-road vehicle) and alludes to the long-running G-Class. This is followed by the letter "L" that acts as a linkage with the letter "C" to signify that the vehicle is a SUV equivalent to the C-Class.



First generation (X253/C253; 2015) 

Like its predecessor, it is assembled at Mercedes-Benz's plant in Bremen, Germany. Since the main GLC production site in Bremen already runs at full capacity, Mercedes-Benz have decided to expand the production capacity by utilizing Valmet Automotive plant at Uusikaupunki, Finland. The manufacturing of the GLC started in Finland during Q1 of 2017.

The first-generation GLC was available in a five-door body style with seating for five. Mercedes also offers a GLC Coupé, with a sloping rear roof design. In mainland Europe, it is available with three diesel engines, three petrol engines, and a plug-in hybrid. In the United Kingdom, only three diesels and one petrol AMG-model are offered.

Power comes from a choice of 2.0-litre 4-cylinder turbocharged petrol (same engine combined with the electric engine in the 350e hybrid) and 2.2-liter 4-cylinder turbo diesel engines in various power stages mated to a 9-speed (7-speed for the 350e hybrid) G-Tronic automatic transmission. 4MATIC all-wheel-drive is standard in some markets and optional in others.

In the German home market, the GLC 250 4MATIC petrol version is joined by GLC 220d 4MATIC and GLC 250d 4MATIC diesel versions along with a plug-in hybrid version called the 350e. In North America, only the GLC 300, GLC 43 AMG and GLC 63 AMG are available.

GLC L 
In October 2018, Beijing-Benz introduced a long-wheelbase version of the GLC exclusively for China.

The GLC L shares the same engine range as the GLC. All-wheel drive is standard across the range. The standard wheelbase GLC continued to be sold in China alongside the long-wheelbase model.

Powertrain 
GLC

Standard features in the US include dual-zone automatic air conditioning; cruise control; Bluetooth System; 8-way power driver and passenger bucket seats; front, front side, side-curtain, and knee airbags.

GLC Coupé

Facelift
At the 2019 Geneva Motor Show, Mercedes unveiled the refreshed GLC as a 2020 model. New features include an updated MBUX Operating System that can be activated by saying "Hey Mercedes", new engines, a new steering wheel, and a 12.3-inch digital cockpit.

The Coupé-variant was unveiled at 2019 New York International Auto Show.

Engines

GLC F-CELL 
Daimler tested a fleet of fuel cell-powered GLC models, dubbed GLC F-CELL, which entered production in 2018. It features both fuel cells and a battery drive which can be charged externally. Apart from electricity, it also runs on pure hydrogen.

Second generation (X254; 2022) 

The second generation GLC was unveiled in June 2022. Similar to the W206 C-Class, all models will be equipped with four-cylinder engines with MHEV tech. Three PHEV models are available. The X254 GLC is also larger than its predecessor.

Sales

References

External links

 Official website (Germany)

GLC
Cars introduced in 2015
2020s cars
Compact sport utility vehicles
Luxury crossover sport utility vehicles
Euro NCAP small off-road
Rear-wheel-drive vehicles
All-wheel-drive vehicles
Plug-in hybrid vehicles